Prodidomus is a genus of long-spinneret ground spiders that was first described by Nicholas Marcellus Hentz in 1847.

Species
 it contains fifty-fivespecies, found in Africa, Europe, South America, Oceania, Asia, the United States, on the Greater Antilles, and Saint Helena:
 Prodidomus amaranthinus (Lucas, 1846) – Mediterranean
 Prodidomus aurantiacus Simon, 1890 – Yemen
 Prodidomus beattyi Platnick, 1977 – Australia
 Prodidomus bendee Platnick & Baehr, 2006 – Australia
 Prodidomus bicolor Denis, 1957 – Sudan
 Prodidomus birmanicus Thorell, 1897 – Myanmar
 Prodidomus bryantae Alayón, 1995 – Cuba
 Prodidomus capensis Purcell, 1904 – South Africa
 Prodidomus chaperi (Simon, 1884) – India
 Prodidomus clarki Cooke, 1964 – Ascension Island
 Prodidomus dalmasi Berland, 1920 – Kenya
 Prodidomus djibutensis Dalmas, 1919 – Somalia
 Prodidomus domesticus Lessert, 1938 – Congo
 Prodidomus duffeyi Cooke, 1964 – Ascension Island
 Prodidomus flavidus (Simon, 1884) – Algeria
 Prodidomus flavipes Lawrence, 1952 – South Africa
 Prodidomus flavus Platnick & Baehr, 2006 – Australia
 Prodidomus geniculosus Dalmas, 1919 – Tunisia
 Prodidomus granulosus Cooke, 1964 – Rwanda
 Prodidomus hispanicus Dalmas, 1919 – Spain, Greece
 Prodidomus inexpectatus Zamani, Chatzaki, Esyunin & Marusik, 2021 – Iran
 Prodidomus kimberley Platnick & Baehr, 2006 – Australia
 Prodidomus lampeli Cooke, 1964 – Ethiopia
 Prodidomus latebricola Cooke, 1964 – Tanzania
 Prodidomus longiventris (Dalmas, 1919) – Philippines
 Prodidomus margala Platnick, 1976 – Pakistan
 Prodidomus maximus Lessert, 1936 – Mozambique
 Prodidomus nigellus Simon, 1890 – Yemen
 Prodidomus nigricaudus Simon, 1893 – Venezuela
 Prodidomus opacithorax Simon, 1893 – Venezuela
 Prodidomus palkai Cooke, 1972 – India
 Prodidomus papavanasanemensis Cooke, 1972 – India
 Prodidomus purpurascens Purcell, 1904 – South Africa
 Prodidomus purpureus Simon, 1907 – West Africa
 Prodidomus redikorzevi Spassky, 1940 – Turkey, Azerbaijan, Iraq, Iran, Kazakhstan, Turkmenistan
 Prodidomus reticulatus Lawrence, 1927 – Namibia
 Prodidomus revocatus Cooke, 1964 – Mauritius
 Prodidomus robustus Dalmas, 1919 – Ethiopia
 Prodidomus rodolphianus Dalmas, 1919 – East Africa
 Prodidomus rollasoni Cooke, 1964 – Libya
 Prodidomus rufus Hentz, 1847 –  Israel, China, Japan, New Caledonia, USA, Cuba, Argentina, Chile, St. Helena
 Prodidomus saharanpurensis (Tikader, 1982) – India
 Prodidomus sampeyae Platnick & Baehr, 2006 – Australia
 Prodidomus seemani Platnick & Baehr, 2006 – Australia 
 Prodidomus simoni Dalmas, 1919 – South Africa
 Prodidomus singulus Suman, 1967 – Hawaii
 Prodidomus sirohi Platnick, 1976 – India
 Prodidomus stella (Saaristo, 2002) – Seychelles
 Prodidomus tigrinus Dalmas, 1919 – West Africa
 Prodidomus tirumalai Cooke, 1972 – India
 Prodidomus venkateswarai Cooke, 1972 – India
 Prodidomus watongwensis Cooke, 1964 – Tanzania
 Prodidomus woodleigh Platnick & Baehr, 2006 – Australia
 Prodidomus wunderlichi Deeleman-Reinhold, 2001 – Thailand
 Prodidomus yorke Platnick & Baehr, 2006 – Australia

See also
 List of Prodidominae species

References

Araneomorphae genera
Cosmopolitan spiders
Prodidominae